Dmitri Frolov (born August 22, 1966) is a retired ice hockey player who played in the Soviet Hockey League.  He played for HC Dynamo Moscow and SKA St. Petersburg.  He was inducted into the Russian and Soviet Hockey Hall of Fame in 1993.

Career statistics

International statistics

External links
 
 Russian and Soviet Hockey Hall of Fame bio

1966 births
People from Temirtau
Avangard Omsk players
Barys Nur-Sultan players
Calgary Flames draft picks
Dinamo Riga players
EHC Lustenau players
HC CSKA Moscow players
HC Dynamo Moscow players
Living people
HC Milano players
Russian ice hockey defencemen
SKA Saint Petersburg players
Soviet ice hockey defencemen
Wedemark Scorpions players